Beat Radio originally was an unlicensed radio station in Minneapolis, Minnesota that played dance music. Founded by local radio DJ and programmer, Alan Freed, in 1996, the station served downtown Minneapolis and surrounding neighborhoods and reached into the western, northwestern and southwestern suburbs. The original station at 97.7 FM operated for 103 days until it was shut down by the Federal Communications Commission. Beat Radio subsequently moved to licensed stations and eventually became a nationwide radio network.

History
Freed, who had worked on-air at local stations WWTC, KTCJ, KMOJ, KBEM-FM, the now-defunct KMAP and at WUSL Philadelphia ("Power99"), launched Beat Radio on July 21, 1996 on 97.7 FM with a 20 watt transmitter at 110 feet in downtown Minneapolis. For the next three months, the unauthorized station played non-stop house, and other forms of club music on a signal that covered most of the city and into the north, west and southwest suburbs. The station was not licensed and on November 1, 1996, Beat Radio was silenced by FCC agents accompanied by U.S. Marshals. The FCC had to defend its action in U.S. District Court as Freed challenged the agency in a legal case that lasted for four years and reached the Eighth Circuit Court of Appeals. No fines or penalties were levied against Freed or anyone related to the station.

However, this was not the end of Beat Radio. A year later, in November 1997, Beat Radio returned to the air for three hours a week on local community station KFAI on Sunday nights from 2 to 5AM. Beat Radio also hosted events at local nightclubs, including First Avenue in Minneapolis.

Beat Radio expanded nationwide when locally owned, pioneering children's radio network Radio AAHS discontinued operations in 1998. The network's owner, Children's Broadcasting Corporation, needed programming for its owned and operated AM stations until the stations were sold. So on February 18, 1998, Beat Radio began airing live nightly from Minneapolis on the ten CBC stations across the United States, in Los Angeles (830), New York (1660), Chicago (930), Denver (1340), Phoenix (740), Ft. Worth/Dallas (1360), Kansas City (1480), Philadelphia (1590), Detroit (1090) and Minneapolis/St. Paul (1280). The national broadcast continued until October 24, 1998, when the sale of the stations to Catholic Family Radio closed.

Beat Radio returned yet again, less than a year later, on July 24, 1999, when it started airing on KVSC from St. Cloud, Minnesota. It aired on the second Saturday of every month from 4 to 7PM until December 1999, when Freed joined Grooveradio.com, an early dance music webcaster, in Los Angeles.

Alan Freed is still heavily involved in dance music radio as a consultant. He went on to program BPM on XM Satellite Radio from 2004 to 2007 and later, from 2007 to 2008, was Music Director at WorldSpace Satellite Radio's The System dance channels, one of which was programmed for XM on channel 82 (defunct as of February 6, 2009).

External links
 Beat Radio
 Beat Radio TV News Coverage part 1 (Video)
 Beat Radio TV News Coverage part 2 (Video)

Radio stations in Minnesota
Pirate radio stations in the United States
Defunct radio networks in the United States
Defunct mass media in Minnesota
1996 establishments in Minnesota
1996 disestablishments in Minnesota
Radio stations established in 1996
Radio stations disestablished in 1996
Radio stations disestablished in 1998
Radio stations established in 1998
Defunct radio stations in the United States